The Black Pearl is a 1928 American silent mystery film directed by Scott Pembroke and starring Lila Lee, Ray Hallor and Carl Stockdale. It is based on a 1912 novel titled The Black Pearl by Nancy Mann Waddel Woodrow, with a plot very similar to that of Wilkie Collins' 1868 novel The Moonstone. Both novels involved a mystery around a jewel stolen from an Indian idol that carries a horrible curse.

Reviews from the time suggest this "old dark house" mystery had less humor and more suspense than most, but the film is today considered lost, so it all remains conjecture. Actress Lila Lee went on to star in the 1930 sound remake of The Unholy Three, starring Lon Chaney.  Carl Stockdale, who plays the detective/hero of the film, had a long and varied career, appearing in The Vampire Bat (1933), Mad Love (1935) and Revenge of the Zombies (1936), among many other films.

Synopsis
A black pearl stolen from an Indian idol is reputedly cursed. After Silas Lathrop inherits it, he receives threatening messages and is marked for death. He gathers around him all of the members of his family for the reading of his will. There follows a mystery much in the "old dark house" genre. After several murders, a detective named Bertram Chisholm solves the case.

Cast
 Lila Lee as Eugenie Bromley 
 Ray Hallor as Robert Lathrop 
 Carl Stockdale as Ethelbert / Bertram Chisolm, the detective 
 Howard Lorenz as Dr. Drake 
 Adele Watson as Sarah Runyan 
 Thomas A. Curran as Silas Lathrop 
 Sybil Grove as Miss Sheen 
 Lew Short as Eugene Bromley 
 George B. French as Stephen Runyan 
 Joseph Belmont as Wiggenbottom 
 Art Rowlands as Claude Lathrop

References

Bibliography
 Ken Wlaschin. Silent Mystery and Detective Movies: A Comprehensive Filmography. McFarland, 2009.

External links
 

1928 films
1928 mystery films
American silent feature films
American mystery films
Films directed by Scott Pembroke
American black-and-white films
Rayart Pictures films
1920s English-language films
1920s American films
Silent mystery films